Henry County is a county located in the north central portion of the U.S. state of Kentucky bordering the Kentucky River. As of the 2020 census, the population was 15,678.  Its county seat is New Castle, but its largest city is Eminence. The county was founded in 1798 from portions of Shelby County. It was named for the statesman and governor of Virginia Patrick Henry. Henry County is included in the Louisville/Jefferson County, KY-IN Metropolitan Statistical Area. Since the 1990s, it has become an increasingly important exurb, especially as land prices have become higher in neighboring Oldham County. With regard to the sale of alcohol, it is classified as a wet county.

Geography

Adjacent counties
 Carroll County (north)
 Owen County (east)
 Franklin County (southeast)
 Shelby County (south)
 Oldham County (west)
 Trimble County (northwest)

Demographics

As of the census of 2000, there were 15,060 people, 5,844 households, and 4,330 families residing in the county. The racial makeup of the county was 93.97% White, 3.30% Black or African American, 0.24% Native American, 0.35% Asian, 0.02% Pacific Islander, 1.26% from other races, and 0.86% from two or more races.  2.25% of the population were Hispanic or Latino of any race.

There were 5,844 households, out of which 33.80% had children under the age of 18 living with them, 58.70% were married couples living together, 10.40% had a female householder with no husband present, and 25.90% were non-families. 22.00% of all households were made up of individuals, and 9.90% had someone living alone who was 65 years of age or older.  The average household size was 2.57 and the average family size was 2.97.

The age distribution was 25.40% under the age of 18, 7.90% from 18 to 24, 29.70% from 25 to 44, 24.70% from 45 to 64, and 12.30% who were 65 years of age or older.  The median age was 37 years. For every 100 females, there were 99.30 males.  For every 100 females age 18 and over, there were 95.90 males.

The median income for a household in the county was $37,263, and the median income for a family was $45,009. Males had a median income of $31,478 versus $21,982 for females. The per capita income for the county was $17,846.  About 10.40% of families and 13.70% of the population were below the poverty line, including 15.50% of those under age 18 and 19.90% of those age 65 or over.

Communities

 Bethlehem
 Campbellsburg
 Defoe
 Eminence
 Franklinton
 Lockport
 New Castle (county seat)
 Pendleton
 Pleasureville
 Port Royal
 Sligo
 Smithfield
 Sulphur
 Turners Station

Notable residents

 Wendell Berry, writer
 Reuben T. Durrett, lawyer, author, and Kentucky historian
 William J. Graves, U.S. congressman

Politics

Education
School districts include:
 Henry County School District
 Eminence Independent School District

See also

 Louisville-Jefferson County, KY-IN Metropolitan Statistical Area
 Louisville/Jefferson County–Elizabethtown–Bardstown, KY-IN Combined Statistical Area
 National Register of Historic Places listings in Henry County, Kentucky

References

External links
 Henry County Government website

 
Kentucky counties
Louisville metropolitan area
1798 establishments in Kentucky
Populated places established in 1798